Sul Hoon (Korean: 설훈, 23 April 1953 ~ ) is a South Korean activist and politician currently serving as a member of National Assembly in Wonmi District's 2nd constituency of Bucheon. He is also one of the Vice presidents in Democratic Party of Korea since August 2018.

Biography 
Born at Masan (now Changwon), Sul Hoon studied history at Korea University. His father, Sul Cheol-soo, was an independence activist.

While he was studying at university, he was arrested for two times after participating for anti-dictatorship protests. At this time, he met Kim Dae-jung, who then became the President of the country.

Political career 
Sul Hoon started his political career in 1985, as a secretary of Kim Dae-jung. He firstly ran as the candidate of Peace Democratic Party in 1988 at Seongbuk District's 1st constituency, but defeated by independent candidate Lee Chul. He did not participate for the general election in 1992.

During the general election in 1996, Sul Hoon was the candidate from National Congress for New Politics at Dobong District's 2nd constituency, and defeated Yoo In-tae of United Democratic Party. He was re-elected in 2000. Nevertheless, he boycotted the 2004 election in order to against the impeachment of the President Roh Moo-hyun.

He returned as an MP in 2012 and was re-elected in 2016. During the party leadership election in 2018, he contested as the party's Vice Presidential candidate and elected as 3rd.

Criticism 
During the presidential election in 2002, Sul Hoon claimed that Lee Hoi-chang, the candidate of Grand National Party (then Liberty Korea Party), accepted $20 from Choi Kyu-seon. He was accused of spreading fake news and sentenced 1.5-year of imprisonment in 2005.

He was widely criticised in 2019, after he mentioned that the President Moon Jae-in's approval rating was dropping among the youths as the majority of them was not educated properly under both Lee Myung-bak and Park Geun-hye's administration.

See also 
 2019 South Korean Capitol attack

Election results

General elections

References

External links 
 Official website
 Sul Hoon on Blog
 Sul Hoon on Twitter
 Sul Hoon on Facebook
 Sul Hoon on YouTube

1953 births
Living people
Minjoo Party of Korea politicians
Korea University alumni
People from Changwon